Icehenge is a science fiction novel by American author Kim Stanley Robinson, published in 1984.

Though published almost ten years before Robinson's Mars trilogy, and taking place in a different version of the future, Icehenge contains elements that also appear in his Mars series, such as extreme human longevity, Martian political revolution, historical revisionism, and shifts between primary characters.

Plot
Icehenge is set at three distinct time periods, and told from the perspective of three different characters.

The first narrative is the diary of an engineer caught up in a Martian political revolution in 2248. Effectively kidnapped aboard a mutinous Martian spaceship, she provides assistance to the revolutionaries in their quest for interstellar travel, but ultimately chooses not to travel with them but to return to the doomed revolution on Mars.

The second narrative is told from the perspective of an archaeologist three centuries later. He is involved in a project investigating the failed revolution, and during this finds the engineer's diary buried near the remains of a ruined city. At the same time, a mysterious monument is found at the north pole of Pluto, tying up with a passing mention in the engineer's diary.

In the final narrative, the great-grandson of the archaeologist visits the monument on Pluto, a scaled-up version of Stonehenge carved in ice. He is investigating the possibility that both the diary and the monument were planted by a reclusive and wealthy businesswoman who lives in the orbit of Saturn.

Development history
The first part of this novel was originally published as the novella To Leave a Mark in the November 1982 issue of The Magazine of Fantasy & Science Fiction. The third part of Icehenge was originally published as the novella On the North Pole of Pluto in 1980 in the anthology Orbit 18 edited by Damon Knight.  Robinson gave the novella in rough form to Ursula K. Le Guin to read and edit while he was enrolled in her writing workshop at UCSD in the spring of 1977. Views of Saturn from the space station visited by the narrator of the novel's third section were inspired by images of Saturn taken during the Voyager flybys in 1980–1981.

Publication history
 1984, United States, Ace Books , Pub date October 1984, paperback
 1985, United Kingdom, Futura Orbit , Pub date December 1985, paperback
 1986, United Kingdom, MacDonald , Pub date October 1986, hardback
 1986, France, Denoël , Pub date September 1986, paperback
 1986, Italy, Editrice Nord , Pub date 1986, paperback
 1987, West Germany, Bastei-Lübbe , Pub date 1987, paperback
 1990, United States, Tor Books , Pub date September 1990, paperback
 1997, United Kingdom, Voyager , Pub date 15 September 1997, paperback
 1997, Croatia, Zagrebačka naklada , Pub date 1997, paperback
 1997, Bulgaria, Лира Принт , Pub date 1997, paperback
 1998, United States, Tor Orb , Pub date July 1998, paperback
 2001, People's Republic of China, 漓江出版社 , Pub date 2001, paperback
 2003, France, Gallimard , Pub date December 2003, paperback
 2004, Spain, Minotauro , Pub date 9 March 2004, paperback
 2009, United Kingdom, Voyager , Pub date 1 August 2009, paperback

References

External links
 The work of disenchantment never ends: Kim Stanley Robinson’s Icehenge by Jo Walton
 

1984 American novels
Novels by Kim Stanley Robinson
Fiction set on Pluto
Ace Books books
Fiction set on Saturn